U.S. Route 40 or U.S. Highway 40 (US 40), also known as the Main Street of America, is a major east–west United States Highway traveling across the United States from the Mountain States to the Mid-Atlantic States. As with most routes whose numbers end in a zero, US 40 once traversed the entire United States. It is one of the first U.S. Highways created in 1926 and its original termini were in San Francisco, California, and Atlantic City, New Jersey. US 40 currently ends at a junction with I-80 in Silver Summit, Utah, just outside Salt Lake City. West of this point US 40 was functionally replaced with I-80, and as these segments of I-80 were constructed the western portion of US 40 was truncated several times.

Starting at its western terminus in Utah, US 40 crosses a total of 12 states, including Colorado, Kansas, Missouri, Illinois, Indiana, Ohio, West Virginia, Pennsylvania, Maryland, Delaware, and New Jersey. US 40 passes through or by major cities including Denver, Kansas City, St. Louis, Indianapolis, Columbus, Baltimore, and Wilmington. Three former and four current state capitals lie along the route. For much of its route, US 40 runs parallel to or concurrently with several major Interstate Highways: I-70 from Denver, Colorado, to Washington, Pennsylvania; and again from Hancock, Maryland to Baltimore; I-64 in parts of Missouri and Illinois; I-68 along the Maryland Panhandle; and I-95 from Baltimore to New Castle, Delaware.

The route was built on top of several older highways, most notably the National Road and the Victory Highway. The National Road was created in 1806 by an act of Congress to serve as the first federally funded highway construction project. When completed it connected Cumberland, Maryland, with Vandalia, Illinois. The Victory Highway was designated as a memorial to World War I veterans and ran from Kansas City, Missouri to San Francisco. Other important roads that have become part of US 40 include Zane's Trace in Ohio, Braddock Road in Maryland and Pennsylvania, part of the Black Horse Pike in New Jersey, part of the Oregon Trail in Kansas, and the Lincoln Highway throughout most of California.

Route description

|-
|UT
|174.54
|280.89
|-
|CO
|496.44
|798.94
|-
|KS
|423.67
|681.83
|-
|MO
|255.05
|410.46
|-
|IL
|159.99
|257.48
|-
|IN
|143.95
|231.67
|-
|OH
|228.37
|367.53
|-
|WV
|15.87
|25.54
|-
|PA
|82.46
|132.71
|-
|MD
|220.88
|355.47
|-
|DE
|17.18
|27.65
|-
|NJ
|64.28
|103.45
|}

Utah

The western terminus of US 40 is in Silver Summit, Utah at an interchange with Interstate 80, several miles north of Park City, at Silver Creek Junction. The road is concurrent with US 189 until it has reached Heber City. From there, the road takes a generally southerly course to Heber City. In Heber City, there is an intersection with SR-113. One mile later, US 189 splits off. There are no more major intersections until US 40 has reached Fruitland, as it meets SR-208. About 18 miles later, the road enters Duchesne. In Duchesne, it meets US 191 and SR-87. US 40 passes Duchesne and starts a concurrency. The concurrency continues into Roosevelt, Fort Duchesne and Vernal. In Roosevelt, it meets SR-87 again in a five-point intersection. There are two intersections with SR-121, in Roosevelt and Vernal. In Fort Duchesne, there is an intersection with SR-88. After US 40 passes Vernal, US 191 splits off and the concurrency ends. After that, there are no more major intersections until US 40 reaches Naples, as it meets SR-45. About  later, US 40 enters Jensen. In Jensen, there is an intersection with SR-149. About  later, the road enters Colorado.

Colorado

In Dinosaur, there is an intersection with Colorado State Highway 64. After passing Dinosaur, there are no more major intersections until US 40 reaches Maybell, as it meets with Colorado State Highway 318. 30 miles later, the road enters Craig. In Craig, US 40 starts a very short concurrency with State Highway 13 (SR 13). After Craig, SH 13 splits off. The road then passes through Hayden without major intersections. Then it exits Hayden and enters Steamboat Springs. There is an intersection with SH 131 and SH 14. US 40 then continues southeast into Kremmling. In Kremmling, there is an intersection with SH 134 and SH 9. It then exits Kremmling and enters Granby. There is an intersection with US 34. The road then passes Fraser and Winter Park without major intersections. About  later, US 40 starts a concurrency with I-70. About  later, I-70 splits off. s later, it is concurrent again.  later, I-70 splits off again. After the second concurrency with I-70, US 40 enters Denver.

The road passes through downtown Denver on Colfax Avenue, and has intersections with SH 391, SH 121, SH 95, and SH 2 and an interchange with US 287. The route through Denver also serves as the business loop for I-70. East of Denver, US 40 passes through Aurora and becomes concurrent with I-70 once again.  later, it enters Limon. In Limon, I-70 splits off, however the road is still concurrent with US 287. There is an intersection with SH 71. US 40 then passes Hugo without major intersections. In Wild Horse, it meets SH 94. About  later, the road enters Kit Carson. There is an intersection with SH 59. After Kit Carson, US 287 splits off and the concurrency ends. After that, there are no more major intersections until US 40 reaches Cheyenne Wells, as it meets US 385 in an interchange. The road then passes Arapahoe without major intersections.  later, US 40 enters Kansas.

Kansas

US 40 enters Kansas near the unincorporated community of Weskan. The first sizable town it enters is Sharon Springs, where it intersects K-27. From there it goes northeast to Oakley and follows Eagle Eye Road before merging with I-70 east of town. The two routes remain merged until Topeka, although the prior alignment of US 40, named Old Highway 40, parallels I-70 for most of the way. From Ellsworth to Salina, the old alignment of US 40 is signed as K-140.

In Topeka, US 40 leaves I-70 at exit 366, follows the Oakland Expressway concurrent with K-4 north to 6th Avenue, then heads east along 6th Avenue out of town. Through Topeka, US 40 closely follows the route of the Oregon Trail. At the Shawnee-Douglas county line near Big Springs, US 40 crosses to the south of I-70 and enters Lawrence from the west along West 6th Street. At the west side of Lawrence, the route is joined by K-10 and travels south and east to the junction with US 59 and then runs north with US 59 to cross the Kansas River. It follows North 2nd and North 3rd Streets, crosses back under I-70, leaves US 59, and merges with US 24 before leaving town.

US 40 remains merged with US 24 as the two routes travel northeast to the town of Tonganoxie. From there, the merged routes turn due east toward Kansas City, Kansas. In Kansas City, US 40 and US 24 intersect US 73 and K-7, and turning south toward Interstate 70. US 40, along with US 24, then merge onto I-70 and recross the Kansas River over the Lewis and Clark Viaduct just before entering Kansas City, Missouri.

On December 1, 2008, US 40, along with US 24 and US 73, was rerouted south along K-7 west of Kansas City to the intersection with I-70. Before this date, US 40 and US 24 continued along State Avenue to College Parkway before turning right to follow Turner Diagonal for  where US 40 joined Interstate 70 for the duration of its journey eastward toward Missouri.

In 1951, the State of Kansas designated U.S. Route 40 as a Blue Star Memorial Highway from border to border.

Missouri

US 40 enters Missouri in Kansas City along a concurrency with I-70. It leaves I-70 at exit 7A. US 40 parallels I-70 to the north through Kansas City until exit 11, where it crosses and parallels it to the south through the suburbs of Independence, Lee's Summit, Blue Springs, and Grain Valley before it rejoins I-70 at exit 24. An older alignment carries the designation "Old US 40".

US 40 stays with I-70 until it reaches Boonville, where it leaves at exit 101, along with Business Loop 70. Both designations follow Ashley Road, before US 40 leaves and heads north along Main Street. After crossing the Missouri River in Boonville, US 40 turns east before rejoining I-70 again at exit 121 on the outskirts of Columbia. The two routes remain concurrent until exit 210A in Wentzville.

From Wentzville, US 40 now joins a concurrency with I-64 and US 61 and heads southeast, crossing the Missouri River again over the Daniel Boone Bridge in St. Charles. US 40 stays joined with I-64 and leaves the state in St. Louis on the Poplar Street Bridge across the Mississippi River, along with I-64 and I-55.

Until 1926, US 40 in Missouri was Route 2.

On January 2, 2008, five miles (8 km) of the route in St. Louis was closed both eastbound and westbound from I-170 to I-270. It re-opened December 15, 2008 two weeks ahead of the originally scheduled date of December 31, 2008. On December 13, 2008, another five-mile (8 km) section of the freeway closed both ways from I-170 to the Kingshighway exit in the city. It was re-opened on December 7, 2009. The entire freeway is now open for travel, with the speed limit raised to 60 mph on most of the stretch. It is also now a full freeway all the way from Downtown St. Louis to Wentzville. When complete, the entire new freeway was signed as Interstate 64.

Illinois

The next  of US 40 lie within the state of Illinois. Except where the route has been re-aligned with Interstate 70, it is an entirely undivided surface route. Formerly a major highway, it has lost most of its non-local traffic to Interstate 70. Some early bypasses of towns were built with the apparent intention of twinning them as a divided highway with access limited to intersections. I-70 uses none of those old bypasses that remain as sections of US 40. The westernmost portion of the historic National Road lies on most of the US 40 alignment in Illinois.

US 40 crosses into Illinois at East St. Louis on the Poplar Street Bridge concurrent with I-55/I-64. The route has a close relationship with I-70 for the remainder of the time it spends in the state, being directly concurrent with or paralleling it throughout Illinois.

Between Pocahontas and Mulberry Grove, US 40 passes through several small towns. In Vandalia, Illinois, the former state capitol, it follows Veterans Avenue and Kennedy Boulevard (with US 51) through town. The Old State House in Vandalia marks the western terminus of the National Road, one of the earliest roads upon which US 40 was designated. From Vandalia, the road continues to the northeast passing through the early German settlement town of Teutopolis and several city streets in Effingham. Beyond Effingham, US 40 passes through many small unincorporated towns before leaving the state near Marshall.

Indiana

US 40 enters Indiana from the west at unincorporated Liggett along with I-70. US 40 leaves the interstate at exit 11 and heads north through the east side of  Terre Haute with SR 46. The road leaves the city to the northeast upon reaching Wabash Avenue.

Upon leaving Terre Haute, US 40 passes through the small towns of Seelyville, Brazil, Knightsville and Harmony.   Between Seelyville and Brazil, the road bypasses several small unincorporated communities which are served by State Road 340, a former alignment of US 40. The road continues to the northeast beyond Harmony, passing many unincorporated places such as Reelsville, Pleasant Gardens, Manhattan, Putnamville, Mount Meridian, Stilesville and Belleville along the way to Plainfield, a suburb of Indianapolis.

In Plainfield, US 40 is Main Street and passes The Shops at Perry Crossing and a nostalgic stainless steel diner. Upon leaving Plainfield, US 40 becomes Washington Street, where it passes by the northern edge of Indianapolis International Airport. After passing the airport, US 40 is now routed onto Interstate 465 Southbound on the west side of Indianapolis. A sign along the entrance ramp advises motorists "For US 40 East, Follow I-465 South to Exit 46." (Previously, the highway did not join with I-465 but continued along Washington Street, where it entered Indianapolis proper near Eagle Creek, a tributary of the White River. In downtown Indianapolis, the old highway crossed White River on a bridge that is now pedestrian only and part of White River State Park and North of the current Indianapolis Zoo. The new alignment diverts at White River Parkway W. Dr. and rejoins original route at the Indiana State Museum, the length of US 40 replaced is about .9 of a mile. The new alignment included the diversion to create White River State Park, and split into a pair of one-way streets: Washington Street carries westbound traffic and Maryland Street carries eastbound traffic. Originally US 40 was 2-way street all through town. In Indianapolis, the old highway passes several key landmarks, including White River State Park, the Indianapolis Zoo, the Indiana State Museum, the Eiteljorg Museum, Victory Field, the Lucas Oil Stadium, and the Indiana Statehouse.) Along the eastern edge of Indianapolis, US 40 leaves I-465 at Exit 46 and is once again routed onto Washington Street.

East of Indianapolis, US 40 enters Cumberland where it takes the name National Road.

Note: Just east of Knightstown, cross the Big Blue River, on the right is part of the old National Road. This section is about 4.3 miles long and rejoins US 40 in Dunreith.

US 40's last stop in Indiana is the city of Richmond. In Richmond, it passes a statue known as Madonna of the Trail, one of a series of twelve statues across the U.S. that memorialize women pioneers who made the trek to settle the western U.S. In 1968, a section of US 40 (Main Street) in Richmond was destroyed by a massive gas explosion. This caused a section of Main Street to be closed to automobile traffic, and US 40 was rerouted along North A Street (westbound) and South A Street (eastbound). Near the Indiana/Ohio border, US 40 crosses I-70 at exit 156B before entering Ohio.

Ohio

US 40 enters Ohio just to the south of New Paris. The road is always close to the newer I-70 eastward toward Dayton. In Vandalia, the road passes to the south of Dayton International Airport and crosses the Dixie Highway and I-75 and the Great Miami River. The road never actually enters Dayton, instead skirting the northern suburbs on the way toward Springfield.

The portion of US 40 between Medway-Carlisle Road (Ohio State Route 571/County Road 303) and Lammes Lane in Bethel Township, Clark County, is designated "Staff Sergeant Wesley Williams Memorial Highway", in honor of a 2005 Tecumseh High School graduate who died on December 10, 2012, while serving in the U.S. Army, from injuries suffered when enemy forces attacked his unit with an improvised explosive device in Kandahar Province, Afghanistan. The designated portion of road runs by the high school.

In Springfield, US 40 is split between two one-way streets. North Street carries US 40 West and Columbia Street carries US 40 East. The route then shifts on to East Main Street before leaving town to the east, once again as National Road. I-70 crosses again at unincorporated Harmony. US 40 passes just north of London where it intersects Ohio State Route 56 and US 42 before heading into West Jefferson. In West Jefferson, US 40 is routed on Main Street.

In the Columbus metropolitan area, US 40 enters from the west as Broad Street. Among the sites along US 40 in Columbus are the Ohio Statehouse, the Columbus Museum of Art, and LeVeque Tower, the oldest skyscraper in Columbus. In Bexley, the route follows Main Street, using Drexel Avenue to get between Broad and Main. US 40 continues as Main Street through Reynoldsburg before leaving the Columbus area as National Road yet again.

In Zanesville, the road becomes Main Street, and at the center of town US 40 begins a concurrency with US 22 that carries it to Cambridge. US 40 crosses the Muskingum River in Zanesville on the famous Y-Bridge. Routes 22 and 40 enter Cambridge from the southwest along John Glenn Highway, and split in town; US 40 follows Wheeling Avenue. In Old Washington, US 40 joins I-70 at Exit 186. It leaves I-70 at exit 201 near Morristown. The two roads cross paths several times before they both leave Ohio on a pair of bridges across the Ohio River at Bridgeport.

The now-decommissioned Ohio State Route 440 ran along old US 40 in places where US 40 had been shifted onto I-70.

West Virginia

It diverges from I-70 east of the Fort Henry Bridge and into the northern section on the downtown Wheeling area, where it meets with the Wheeling Suspension Bridge, which was the former link for the National Road. 

It then turns twice left and passes over I-70 and Wheeling Hill, past McColloch's Leap, and into the Wheeling suburbs. It intersects WV Route 88 halfway through this leg of US 40, and the southbound leg of WV 88 runs concurrent with US 40 at this point until it reaches Elm Grove, where US 40 turns left and heads into Tridelphia and Valley Grove before reaching the Pennsylvania state line.

Pennsylvania

US 40 enters Pennsylvania at West Alexander. It closely parallels I-70 from West Virginia until it reaches Washington where it follows Chestnut St, Jefferson Avenue and Maiden Street. In Washington, US 40 passes to the south of Washington & Jefferson College. Following Maiden Street out of town, the road turns southeast toward the town of California. A short limited access highway in California and West Brownsville provides an approach to the Lane Bane Bridge across the Monongahela River. From here, the road continues southeast to Uniontown.

US 40 bypasses Uniontown along a limited access highway that also carries US 119. An old alignment through Uniontown is signed as "Business US 40." Southeast of Uniontown, travellers pass the Fort Necessity National Battlefield. It follows Braddock Road southeast of Uniontown, crossing the Youghiogheny River Lake on a bridge completed in 2006. US 40 leaves Pennsylvania at Addison

Maryland

US 40 enters Maryland from Pennsylvania near Grantsville in the western part of the state. Here, and through most of the state, it is known as National Pike. US 40 leaves National Pike shortly after entering Maryland from the northwest and merges with I-68 and US 219 at exit 14B. The old alignment of US 40, still known as National Pike, is signed through much of the western part of the state as either "Scenic US 40" or "Alternate US 40". US 219 leaves the three-way concurrency at exit 22, but US 40 and I-68 remain on the same pavement through Frostburg and Cumberland.

East of Cumberland, the old National Pike (formerly US 40) carries the MD 144 designation. Just to the east of the cut is the Sideling Hill Exhibit Center, a museum that highlights Western Maryland geology. At Hancock, where the state of Maryland narrows to less than two miles (3 km) wide, I-68 ends, and US 40 merges onto I-70 at exit 1. The two routes closely follow the course of the Chesapeake and Ohio Canal and the Potomac River for several miles before US 40 leaves the Interstate at exit 9. US 40 passes directly through the center of Hagerstown using Washington Avenue (eastbound) and Franklin Street (westbound). Heading southeast out of Hagerstown, US 40 diverges into two separate routes, US 40 and US 40 Alt. US 40 parallels I-70, its longtime travel partner, crossing it at exit 32 near Greenbrier State Park on the Baltimore National Pike alignment. US 40 Alt heads southeast on the Old National Pike alignment through Boonsboro, crossing South Mountain at Turner's Gap. The two routes converge just west of Frederick.

In Frederick, US 40 uses Patrick Street before merging onto the US 15 expressway for a short distance. It leaves US 15 and rejoins I-70 on the outskirts of Frederick. MD 144 once again takes over the old alignment of US 40.

US 40 leaves I-70 for the final time upon entering the western suburbs of Baltimore, once again as Baltimore National Pike. The route passes through Patapsco Valley State Park north of Ellicott City and enters the Baltimore city limits along Edmondson Avenue. East of Gwynns Falls Leakin Park, US 40 becomes Franklin Street, and becomes an expressway (formerly I-170) for a short distance between Pulaski Street and Martin Luther King Jr. Boulevard. Through this area, an alignment called "Truck US 40" diverts larger vehicles onto an alternate route. US 40 passes through the Mount Vernon neighborhood and a few blocks from Baltimore's Washington Monument. After crossing the Jones Falls Expressway (I-83), US 40 follows Orleans Street, and finally becomes the Pulaski Highway as it leaves Baltimore to the northeast.

US 40, for the entire length of Pulaski Highway, closely parallels I-95. Pulaski Highway passes through Gunpowder Falls State Park near Joppa and the Aberdeen Proving Ground. Between Havre de Grace and Perryville it crosses the Susquehanna River on the Thomas J. Hatem Memorial Bridge. US 40 leaves Maryland in Elkton, crossing the border into Delaware.

Delaware

Entering the state from Maryland in Glasgow, it continues along the Pulaski Highway. Much roadside commercial development slows traffic, as there are many traffic lights along the route. US 40 has an interchange with Delaware Route 1 in the community of Bear before merging with US 13 (Dupont Highway) in State Road. The concurrent routes turn north, pass the Wilmington Airport and US 40 splits to join I-295 near Wilmington Manor. US 40, along with I-295, uses the Delaware Memorial Bridge to cross the Delaware River into New Jersey.

New Jersey

US 40 enters New Jersey in Deepwater, New Jersey along with I-295. US 40 briefly joins the New Jersey Turnpike, and exits to the north of the toll booths. The route follows Wiley Road, parallel to the Turnpike, before joining Harding Highway in Carneys Point. US 40 is known as the Harding Highway through most of South Jersey. Northeast of it convergence with US 40, Harding Highway carries the Route 48 designation, although this was once part of US 40 as well.

US 40 enters the borough of Woodstown as a concurrency with Route 45 along West Avenue; it leaves town heading southeast. In Upper Pittsgrove Township, the road changes names to the Pole Tavern-Elmer Road. Passing through Elmer it becomes Chestnut Street and then the Elmer-Malaga Road. In Malaga, it runs concurrent with Route 47 (Delsea Drive). The route bypasses the city of Vineland to the northeast, and becomes Cape May Avenue in Hamilton Township, where it crosses Route 50 in Mays Landing.

US 40 merges with US 322 and the Black Horse Pike in McKee City. The two routes enter Atlantic City along Albany Avenue and pass the Atlantic City Airport. US 40 and US 322 both reach their eastern terminus at the intersection of Albany Avenue and Ventnor Avenue.

History

Early roads
US 40's history can be traced back several centuries. Several well established Native American footpaths, including Nemacolin's Path and Mingo Path in the Maryland-Pennsylvania area, followed similar alignments to US 40. Early American colonists established roads, some following the established Native American paths, that would later serve as US 40. These included a segment of post road between Wilmington, Delaware, and Baltimore, Maryland. In 1755, during the French and Indian Wars, General Edward Braddock blazed a trail en route to capture Fort Duquesne (modern Pittsburgh, Pennsylvania). US 40 closely follows this route between Cumberland, Maryland and Uniontown, Pennsylvania.

Early in the history of the U.S., the State of Maryland established a network of turnpikes for long-distance travel. Three of these would later serve as part of US 40: the Baltimore and Havre de Grace Turnpike, the Baltimore and Frederick Turnpike, and Bank Road. Colonel Ebenezer Zane (for whom Zanesville, Ohio was named) blazed some of the first trails across the Ohio wilderness in the last years of the 18th century. Zane's Trace, as his road was called, stretched from Wheeling, West Virginia, to Maysville, Kentucky. With some minor alignment differences, US 40 closely matches the segment from Wheeling to Zanesville.

Between the cities of Lawrence and Topeka, Kansas, US 40 follows the path of the Oregon Trail. During the 19th century, the Oregon Trail served as a major thoroughfare for people emigrating to the Pacific Northwest. Between 1850 and 1852, some 65,000–70,000 people traveled the trail.

National Road

In 1806, Thomas Jefferson signed into law an act of Congress establishing a National Road to connect the waters of the Atlantic Ocean with the Ohio River. The law mentions Baltimore as its eastern terminus; but the route used established Maryland turnpikes east of Cumberland. A new road was constructed from Cumberland to Wheeling, West Virginia, and later extended across the states of Ohio, Indiana, and Illinois. Segments of the National Road used Braddock's Road and Zane's Trace. Plans to extend the road to Missouri were never completed. The farthest western terminus for the National Road was the Old State House in Vandalia, Illinois.

The National Road was absorbed into the National Old Trails Ocean-to-Ocean highway, a route from New York, New York, to Los Angeles, California in the early 20th century. The National Road became US 40 in the original 1925 plan for U.S. Routes. To this day, many places still name US 40 "National Road", even where the alignment was moved from the original road. Besides US 40, much of the National Road is paralleled by segments of Interstates 68 and 70.

Victory Highway
Most of the western section of US 40 follows the former route of Victory Highway, a road that once linked Kansas City to San Francisco. The road was named as a memorial to fallen World War I veterans. Other than two sections (one in California and one in Kansas/Colorado) most of the original route of US 40 west of Kansas City used Victory Highway. According to a 1926 guide published about the Victory Highway, it was the fastest route between San Francisco and Salt Lake City, allowing travellers to complete the  trip "comfortably and in high gear in from 3 to 4 days." Controversy over the routing of US 40 over the Victory Highway led to a "divided route", with US 40S following the Victory Highway and US 40N taking a more northerly route.

Evolution

US 40 was one of the original 1926 U.S. Highways.

The route was a cross-country, east–west route, as most routes with a "0" number were defined. Though the eastern terminus was planned for State Road, Delaware, by 1927 it was moved to Atlantic City, New Jersey. The western terminus was San Francisco via an auto ferry across San Francisco Bay from the Berkeley Pier in Berkeley, California. Upon completion of the San Francisco–Oakland Bay Bridge, US 40 was re-routed over the bridge, bypassing the ferry pier. Early alignments of the road featured ferries at both ends. To cross the Delaware River, ferries were used, originally from Wilmington, Delaware (1927–1929) and later from New Castle, Delaware (1929–1951). In 1951, the opening of the Delaware Memorial Bridge replaced the ferry service and carried US 40 across the Delaware River.

From 1926 to 1935 the route split in Manhattan, Kansas, into "40N" and "40S" routes; the two routes met again in Limon, Colorado. The "40S" route continued on to Grand Junction, Colorado. In 1935, the split routes were eliminated. US 40N between Manhattan and Limon and then US 40S from Limon to Grand Junction was replaced by U.S. Route 24, the remainder was renumbered as simply US 40.

New alignments for the road were designated in Maryland in 1948 and in Utah in 1950. California's segment of the highway was decommissioned in 1964. By 1966, the western terminus moved to Reno, Nevada. The road shortened again in 1975, to its current western end at Silver Creek Junction, Utah. In 1998, the California segment was given a sort of rebirth with the designation of Historic Route 40 through that state. Further realignments occurred in Utah where the highway was re-routed for the Jordanelle Reservoir in the mid 1990s, and Kansas City, Kansas, in 1999 to make way for the Kansas Speedway. On December 1, 2008, a further realignment in Kansas City rerouted US 40 away from State Avenue and the Turner Diagonal and onto K-7 and Interstate 70.

"In 1998 [Eddie Lange] persuaded the California legislature to designate Route 40 between Reno and San Francisco as Historic Route 40." Together with Trish Gray, the duo designed the signs and a program where local businesses could donate funds to have a sign erected near their business along the route. The signs can now be found throughout the California route and is a popular route for motorcycle clubs and other travel enthusiasts.

Historical route

California

The former route of US 40 in California generally runs parallel to modern Interstate 80. In Contra Costa County it is San Pablo Avenue, now signed as State Route 123 (SR 123). Portions of Historic Route 40 exist in American Canyon, Vallejo, along 5th Street, Alameda Street and Broadway. In Cordelia and Suisun City, the original route is along Cordelia Road. It is also signed as a historic route. The original route is preserved as Texas Street in Fairfield. In Vacaville the highway is preserved as Monte Vista Avenue. In Davis, the highway is now Russell Boulevard, the main street through downtown Davis. In Sacramento the highway followed the routes of modern Capitol Avenue, SR 160 and Auburn Boulevard. Between Roseville and Newcastle, the highway is known as Taylor Road and Pacific Street through Rocklin. Through the Sierra Nevada many portions are still drivable, crossing I-80. Portions still drivable include Applegate Road in Applegate, Hampshire Rocks Road in a rural area near Cisco, and Donner Pass Road over Donner Pass and into Truckee. Between Truckee and the Nevada state line, the former route of US 40 is mostly visible from the freeway, but not drivable as a contiguous route. Portions accessible include Glenshire Drive, Hirshdale Road and Floriston Way.

From 1954 to 1964, an alternate route US 40 was available especially during winter to avoid Donner Pass. Donner Pass, elevation , might be closed in winter. Since Beckwourth Pass was nearly  lower than Donner Pass, it could be kept open longer. Alt. US 40 parted the main track of US 40 near Davis and ran north along what was then signed as US 99W into Woodland. From Woodland, Alt. US 40 ran north along SR 24 through Knights Landing and Robbins into Yuba City. Most of the section from Woodland to Yuba City is now signed as SR 113. From Yuba City, Alt. US 40 ran east through Marysville, then north through Oroville. Continuing north and northeast, Alt. US 40 reached Paxton, then turned south and southeast to Quincy and Beckwourth before crossing. East of Beckwourth Pass, Alt. US 40 descended to meet US 395 at what is now Hallelujah Junction, and followed US 395 into Reno to meet mainline US 40. The section from Marysville to US 395 was then still an extension of SR 24, but is now signed as SR 70, although much of the old highway was moved further west before Lake Oroville was dammed and flooded in 1968.

Nevada

In Nevada, US 40 was also directly replaced by I-80. All of the I-80 business loops use the historical route of US 40. In the Truckee Meadows the route is still drivable as 3rd street in Verdi and 4th street in Reno and Victorian Ave in Sparks. In rural Nevada the highway forms the business loops for Wadsworth, Fernley, Lovelock, Winnemucca, Battle Mountain, Carlin, Elko, and West Wendover. The route and its former alignments can be seen (and some still driven) all along the routing of I-80. Much of the old right-of-way of old US 40 has been either demolished or left to natural degradation.

Utah
In Wendover the former route of US 40 is signed as SR-58 and runs along the Wendover Cut-off, south of (and in view of) I-80, across the Bonneville Salt Flats. The route re-emerges from the shadow of I-80 as SR-138 through Grantsville and Tooele. Interstate 80 was directly paved over the former route of US 40 through Parley's Canyon and over Parley's Summit, with very little of the original pavement remaining through the mountains. East of the Wasatch Mountains is the modern terminus of US 40.

Two routes existed through Salt Lake City. West of Temple Square US 40 was consistently routed on North Temple Street. East of Temple Square US 40 had two alignments, originally departing Temple Square south along State Street concurrent with US 91 and US 89 to 2100 south. The road then used 2100 South and Parley's Way, towards Parley's Canyon. Later US 40 was moved to Foothill Drive, along modern SR-186, with the 2100 south routing becoming US 40ALT. The two routes converged at the mouth of Parley's Canyon.

Major intersections
Utah
  in Silver Creek Junction. US 40/US 189 have a hidden concurrency to Heber City.
  in Duchesne. The highways travel concurrently to Vernal.
Colorado
  in Granby
  east of Empire. The highways travel concurrently to east of Idaho Springs, and intersect again in Golden. There are numerous intersections and overlaps of US 40 and I-70 between here and Maryland.
  in Denver. The highways travel concurrently to east of Kit Carson.
  in Denver
  in Aurora
  in Aurora. I-70/US 40 travels concurrently to Limon. US 36/US 40 travel concurrently to Byers.
  west-northwest of Limon. The highways travel concurrently to east-southeast of Limon.
  in Cheyenne Wells. The highways travel concurrently to east of Cheyenne Wells.
Kansas
  in Oakley. The highways travel concurrently through the city.
  in WaKeeney
  in Hays
  south of Russell
  northwest of Salina
  in Junction City
  in Topeka. US 40/US 75 travels concurrently through the city.
  in Lawrence. The highways travel concurrently through the city.
  in Lawrence. US 24/US 40 travels concurrently to Kansas City, Missouri.
  on the Kansas City–Bonner Springs city line. The highways travel concurrently into Bonner Springs proper.
  in Bonner Springs. I-70/US 40 travels concurrently to Kansas City, Missouri.
  on the Edwardsville–Kansas City city line
  in Kansas City
  in Kansas City. The highways travel concurrently through the city.
  in Kansas City
  in Kansas City. US 40/US 169 travels concurrently to Kansas City, Missouri.
Missouri
  in Kansas City. The highways travel concurrently through the city.
  in Kansas City. US 40/US 71 travels concurrently through Kansas City.
  in Independence
  south of Marshall
  in Columbia
  in Kingdom City
  in Wentzville. I-64/US 40 travels concurrently to East St. Louis, Illinois. US 40/US 61 travels concurrently to the Frontenac–Ladue city line.
  in Town and Country
  on the Frontenac–Ladue city line
  in Richmond Heights
  in St. Louis. I-55/US 40 travels concurrently to Troy, Illinois.
Illinois
  in East St. Louis. I-70/US 40 travel concurrently to Troy.
  in Collinsville
  in Vandalia. The highways travel concurrently to east of Vandalia.
  in Effingham. The highways travel concurrently through the city.
Indiana
  in Terre Haute
  north-northwest of Cloverdale
  in Indianapolis. The highways travel concurrently through the city.
  in Indianapolis. The highways travel concurrently through the city.
  in Indianapolis
  in Indianapolis. US 40/US 421 travels concurrently through the city.
  in Indianapolis. The highways travel concurrently through the city.
  in Richmond
Indiana–Ohio line
  in Richmond, IN, and Jefferson Township, OH
Ohio
  in Monroe Township
  in Vandalia
  west of Springfield
  in Lafayette
  in Lincoln Village
  in Columbus. US 40/US 62 travels concurrently through the city.
  in Columbus
  in Columbus
  in Zanesville. The highways travel concurrently to Cambridge.
  in Cambridge Township
  in Bridgeport. The highways travel concurrently to Wheeling, West Virginia.
West Virginia
  in Wheeling
Pennsylvania
  in Washington. The highways travel concurrently to South Strabane Township.
  in Amwell Township
  in Uniontown. The highways travel concurrently to South Union Township.
Maryland
  in Keysers Ridge. I-68/US 40 travels concurrently to Hancock. US 40/US 219 travels concurrently to east-southeast of Grantsville.
  in Cumberland. The highways travel concurrently through the city.
  north-northwest of Hancock. I-70/US 40 travels concurrently to Indian Springs. US 40/US 522 travels concurrently to Hancock.
  in Hagerstown
  in Hagerstown
  in Frederick. The highways travel concurrently through the city.
  in Frederick
  in Frederick. I-70/US 40 travels concurrently to West Friendship. Between Colorado and here, I-70 has numerous intersections and overlaps with US 40.
  in Ellicott City
  in Catonsville
  in Baltimore
  in Baltimore
  in Rosedale
Delaware
  in State Road. The highways travel concurrently to Wilmington Manor.
  in Wilmington Manor
  in Wilmington Manor. I-295/US 40 travels concurrently to Pennsville Township, New Jersey.
New Jersey
  in Pennsville Township
  in Hamilton Township. The highways travel concurrently to Atlantic City.
  in Pleasantville
 Atlantic Avenue / Pacific Avenue in Atlantic City

See also

 National Road
 All-American Road
 U.S. Route 140 (decommissioned 1980)
 U.S. Route 240 (decommissioned 1971)
 U.S. Route 340

Notes

References

Further reading

External links

 Endpoints of U.S. Highway 40
 

 
40
40
40
40
40
40
Interstate 70
Interstate 80
U.S. Route 040
Roads in Greater St. Louis
Transportation in Cumberland, MD-WV-PA
1926 establishments in the United States